Centrolepis strigosa, commonly known as hairy centrolepis, is a species of plant of the Restionaceae family. It is found in New Zealand (the North and South Islands). and Australia

It is an annual tufted herb of 1.5 to 8 cm high. It has numerous radiating leaves. The leaves are covered in multicellular hispid hairs. Flowering occurs from September to November.

References

strigosa